Thierry Groensteen (born 18 April 1957, Uccle, Brussels) is one of the leading French-speaking comics researchers and theorists, whose work has found influence beyond that field.

Career
In 1984, Groensteen became the editor-in-chief of the old fanzine Schtroumpf : Les Cahiers de la bande dessinée, transforming it into one of the first publications that would lead to serious academic criticism of comics in France and beyond. He integrated the publishing company into discussions on art and culture. His work as the organizer of the famous Colloque de Cérisy, in 1987, titled "Bande dessinée, récit et modernité" ("Comics, narrative and modernity"), was also an important contribution.

As the director of Angoulême's , during the early 1990s, he worked on many projects such as exhibitions and their catalogues as well as on monographs on several authors, or themes and collections presented by the Angoulême Museum. He was also the director of the first run of its official magazine, 9ème Art.

He was the founder and editor at Éditions de L'An 2, before this publishing house was integrated by Actes Sud. He is a lecturer at the École européenne supérieure des Arts et technologies de l'image. He is also a key member of Oubapo association.

Bibliography

Books
Thierry Groensteen has published countless articles and many books, all of which have been important or even broaching of some themes. He has penned, among other titles:
, co-written with Benoît Peeters.

. Translated by Ann Miller as Comics and narration, Jackson: University of Mississippi Press, 2013.

Articles in English

References

External links
 Thierry Groensteen's personal website

Belgian academics
Belgian journalists
Male journalists
Belgian art historians
Belgian comics writers
1957 births
Living people
Comics scholars
Comics critics